Victor Mikhailovich Glushkov (August 24, 1923 – January 30, 1982) was a Soviet mathematician, the founding father of information technology in the Soviet Union and one of the founding fathers of Soviet cybernetics.

He was born in Rostov-on-Don, Russian SFSR, in the family of a mining engineer. Glushkov graduated from Rostov State University in 1948, and in 1952 proposed solutions to Hilbert's fifth problem and defended his thesis in Moscow State University.

In 1956 he began working with computers and worked in Kyiv as a Director of the Computational Center of the Academy of Science of Ukraine. In 1958 he became a member of the Communist Party. In 1962 Glushkov established the famous Institute of Cybernetics of the National Academy of Science of Ukraine and became its first Director. 

He made contributions to the theory of automata. He and his followers (Kapitonova, Letichevskiy and other) successfully applied that theory to enhance construction of computers. His book on that topic "Synthesis of Digital Automata" became well known. For that work, he was awarded the Lenin Prize in 1964 and elected as a Member of the Academy of Science of USSR.

He greatly influenced many other fields of theoretical computer science (including the theory of programming and artificial intelligence) as well as its applications in the USSR. He published nearly 800 printed works.

One of his great practical goals was the creation of the National Automated System for Computation and Information Processing (OGAS), consisting of a computer network to manage the allocation of resources and information among organizations in the national economy, which would represent a higher form of socialist planning than the extant centrally planned economy. This ambitious project was ahead of its time, first being proposed and modeled in 1962. It received opposition from many senior Communist Party leaders who felt the system threatened Party control of the economy. By the early 1970s official interest in this system ended.

Glushkov founded a Kyiv-based Chair of Theoretical Cybernetics and Methods of Optimal Control at the Moscow Institute of Physics and Technology in 1967 and a Chair of Theoretical Cybernetics at Kyiv State University in 1969.
The Institute of Cybernetics of National Academy of Science of Ukraine, which he created, is named after him.

Honors and awards
 Member of the National Academy of Science of Ukraine since 1961.
 Member of the USSR Academy of Sciences since 1964.
 Member of the German Academy of Sciences Leopoldina since 1970.
 Lenin Prize, 1964
 Order of Lenin, 1967, 1975
 USSR State Prize, 1968, 1977
 Hero of Socialist Labor, 1969
 Ukrainian State Prize, 1970, 1981
 Order of the October Revolution, 1973
 Computer Pioneer Award (IEEE), For digital automation of computer architecture, 1996.

See also 
Аналитик
Project Cybersyn
Cybernetics

References

External links
Victor Glushkov - Founder of Information Technologies in Ukraine and former USSR
Pioneers of Soviet Computing

1923 births
1982 deaths
Soviet computer scientists
Soviet mathematicians
Russian inventors
Cyberneticists
Heroes of Socialist Labour
Recipients of the Order of Lenin
Recipients of the USSR State Prize
Lenin Prize winners
Full Members of the USSR Academy of Sciences
Members of the National Academy of Sciences of Ukraine
Foreign Members of the Bulgarian Academy of Sciences
Academic staff of the Moscow Institute of Physics and Technology
Information technology in Ukraine
Members of the German Academy of Sciences Leopoldina
Members of the German Academy of Sciences at Berlin